Matthew Carlisle (February 5, 1910 – November 18, 1972), nicknamed "Lick", was an American professional baseball infielder who played in the Negro leagues. He spent the majority of his career with the Homestead Grays.

Carlisle was born in Wenonah, Alabama; as an adult, he worked as a coal miner. In 1931, he played as the starting shortstop for the Birmingham Black Barons of the Negro leagues, batting .268 for his rookie season. The following year, Carlisle signed with the Montgomery Gray Sox, and had stints with teams active in Memphis and New Orleans in 1934.

In 1935, Carlisle signed with the Homestead Grays, situated as the team's starting second baseman. Hitting .379 on the season, he was nonetheless better known for his defensive capabilities on the field and as a legitimate base stealing threat on the basepaths. Oftentimes, Carlisle hit second in the line-up, in front of teammates Josh Gibson and Buck Leonard. His struggles in 1938, however, after posting just a .139 batting average (BA), precipitated the loss of Carlisle's starting role to Sammy Bankhead in 1939.

A year later, Carlisle was reinserted as a starter, batting .278. With the Grays, he won the 1943 Negro World Series but went 0-for-9 during the series. Carlisle served in the US Navy during World War II, and spent the remainder of his baseball career as a utility man before retiring in 1946.

Carlisle died in Pittsburgh, Pennsylvania in 1972; he was 62 years old.

References

External links
 and Seamheads
 Matthew 'Lick' Carlisle at Negro League Baseball Players Association

1910 births
1972 deaths
Baseball players from Alabama
Birmingham Black Barons players
Homestead Grays players
Memphis Red Sox players
Montgomery Grey Sox players
New York Cubans players
United States Navy personnel of World War II
United States Navy sailors
African Americans in World War II
African-American United States Navy personnel